The South African Institute of Chartered Accountants (SAICA), South Africa’s pre-eminent accountancy body, is widely recognised as one of the world’s leading accounting institutes. The institute provides a wide range of support services to more than 48 000 members and associates who are chartered accountants (CAs(SA)), as well as associate general accountants (AGAs(SA)) and accounting technicians (ATs(SA)).

As of June 2021, the institute has over 48 000 members. SAICA provides support, advice and services to its members throughout their professional lives. SAICA members are business advisors, business leaders and entrepreneurs. SAICA members can use the accredited CA(SA), AGA(SA) or AT(SA) designations.

Membership and qualification
To become a student and a member of the South African Institute of Chartered Accountants the candidate needs to enroll for a BCom Accounting degree or an equivalent CA(SA) undergraduate qualification at a SAICA accredited university.
Once the degree is completed the student is required to complete his Certificate in the Theory of Accounting (CTA). This course focuses on accounting, auditing, taxation and financial management. The course takes a minimum of one year and must be completed at a SAICA accredited university.
Upon completion of CTA, the candidates are eligible to enter into a 3-year learnership with a Registered Training Office (RTO) (to specialise in auditing) or an Approved Training Organisation (ATO) (to specialise in financial management)

Regional representation

SAICA is constituted of four local regional offices as well as two international representative offices, which serve members based in those respective regions. The regions are as follows;

 Northern Region (Gauteng, Mpumalanga and Limpopo provinces);
 Eastern Region (KwaZulu-Natal province);
 Southern Region (Western Cape and Eastern Cape provinces);
 Central Region (Free State, North West and Northern Cape provinces);
 SAICA Australia;
 SAICA United Kingdom (UK).

International involvement

SAICA members serve on international accounting bodies including; the trustees of the International Financial Reporting Standards Foundation (IFRS Foundation), the International Accounting Standards Board (IASB), the International Financial Reporting Interpretations Committee (IFRIC) and the Council of the International Federation of Accountants (IFAC).

International contact and co-operation are fundamental to the standing and image of SAICA. Hence, the institute plays an influential role in the Eastern, Central & Southern African Federation of Accountants (ECSAFA). ECSAFA coordinates the development of the accountancy profession and promotes internationally recognised standards of professional competence and conduct in Eastern, Central and Southern Africa.
SAICA was a charter member of the Pan African Federation of Accountants, which was inaugurated on 5 May 2011.

SAICA is also a member of the Global Accounting Alliance (GAA) – an alliance of the world’s leading professional accountancy bodies, which was formed in 2005. The GAA is intended to promote quality services, share information and collaborate on important international issues. It works with national regulators, governments and stakeholders, through member-body collaboration, articulation of consensus views, and working in collaboration, where possible with other international bodies, especially IFAC.

History

The first professional institute for accountants in South Africa was the Institute of Accountants and Auditors, formed in the South African Republic in Johannesburg in 1894 with 65 members. A year later, the Institute of Accountants in Natal was established. The need to regulate the profession lead to the further establishment of various provincial institutes. In a move towards standardization, the first articles of clerkship were instituted in 1905, and the first journal was published in 1909. Although it did not become a regular publication till 1954, the journal was the sole communication vehicle aimed directly at members and indicated a need for unification. Between 1905 and 1907 accounting societies were established, naming Cape Colony, The Orange River Colony and Natal. By the end of 1907, the Transvaal Society of Accountants (which represented more than a half of the registered accountants in South Africa) had grown to 522 members. From the earliest times attempts were made to form a national body. The first meaningful step took place on 6 May 1921 when the South African Accounting Societies' General Examining Board was formed to conduct the examination process on behalf of the societies. The second major milestone on the road to unification occurred in 1927, when the Chartered Accountants Designation (Private) Act was passed by parliament. The Act provided protection for the CA(SA) allowing only members of the then provincial societies to use it.

But the world and local politics at the time hampered efforts towards forming a national body and it was only in 1945 that the Joint Council of the Societies of Chartered Accountants (SA), which provided a forum for co-operation between the societies, was formed.
In 1950 all theoretical teaching and examining were handed over to universities, but the profession retained the right to set the qualifying examination. The first CTA examinations were held in 1951. The Public Accountants and Auditors Act was also promulgated in 1951 and it brought into place the regulation of accountants and auditors in public practice. The General Examining Board continued to set the qualifying examination until 1957 when it was taken over by the Public Accountants' and Auditors' Board (PAAB).

In 1966 The National Council of Chartered Accountants came into being with its own small secretariat – a further step in the process for unification which was finally achieved in 1980 when the South African Institute of Chartered Accountants was formed with 9012 members.
1973 saw the enactment of a new Companies Act and with it the requirement of companies to present financial statements in accordance with generally accepted accounting practice. The profession, together with chambers of commerce and the Johannesburg Stock Exchange, formed the Accounting Practices Board to issue statements of Generally Accepted Accounting Practice.

An era of change

With the beginnings of globalization, the profession internationally felt the need to work more closely together. This led to the creation of IFAC in 1977 and South Africa was one of the founder members. Although the first woman CA(SA), Miss Elizabeth Kruger, qualified in 1917, it was not until 1977 that Wiseman Nkuhlu was admitted as the first black African CA(SA).

The 1980s proved to be an era of change. While SAICA established numerous committees to improve its service to members and to set standards, the profession recognised the need to open the doors to more black and female CAs(SA). A committee, under the chairmanship of Brian Hawksworth, began to promote this initiative. In 1987 the CAs' Eden Trust came into being as a joint effort between SAICA, the PAAB and the Association for the Advancement of Black Accountants (ABASA) to provide bursaries and grow the number of black CAs(SA). The Eden Trust assisted over 100 black accountants to qualify. In 2002 its name was changed to the Thuthuka Bursary Fund and it was fully incorporated into the institute's transformation and growth strategy.

In 1999 SAICA took over the role of setting the Part 1 of the Qualifying Examination (QE I) from the PAAB (the predecessor of the IRBA), while the PAAB took over the responsibility for setting auditing standards, and with this came more clearly defined roles for both bodies.

Future

The profession began a long process to revise the PAA Act in the early 1990s and this process will come to fruition in 2005 when the Auditing Profession Act (Act 26 of 2005) was promulgated (the Act commenced on 1 April 2006). The process has been upset by a spate of international and local corporate failures, with the result that governments worldwide saw the need for regulation of auditors to be tightened up and became more involved in the process.
Another issue that still requires the profession and SAICA's contribution is that of Transformation. The Thuthuka project, an initiative by SAICA to promote skills development and transformation in the CA profession, was launched in the Eastern Cape in 2002 and it was expanded to Limpopo and Kwazulu-Natal in 2004. This programme is providing education support to African learners and students, and seeks to uplift communities while benefiting the CA profession. To regulate SAICA’s efforts going forward, the Institute has now implemented a system whereby leadership issues are identified by the SAICA Board and delegated to the secretariat, so that each day SAICA adds a little more to its history.
Confusion often arises regarding the differing roles and responsibilities of SAICA and the IRBA [previously the Public Accountants and Auditors Board (PAAB)]. It is important to understand the roles of the two bodies.

SAICA is a non-profit, voluntary body that provides a wide range of services to its members and associates. It is controlled by a Board, elected by members through regional committees, and by bodies representing the Institute's other key constituencies such as members in business (commerce and industry), large practices, small practices and ABASA. The IRBA is the statutory body controlling that part of the accountancy profession involved with public accountancy in the Republic of South Africa.

It is important to stress that all entrants to the accountancy profession are subject to consistent requirements. Following qualification, chartered accountants entering public practice are required to register with the IRBA, whilst keeping their SAICA membership, and are governed by its regulations. Those qualified chartered accountants practicing outside of public practice are not subject to the jurisdiction of the IRBA, but are subject to the jurisdiction of SAICA. The IRBA functions in terms of the Auditing Profession Act, 2005 (Act 26 of 2005). Its members are appointed by the Minister of Finance and not more than 40% of the members of the IRBA Board may be registered auditors.

The IRBA is partly funded by fees and levies payable by registered auditors and partly by the National Treasury. The IRBA reports annually to the Minister of Finance, who then tables the report in Parliament.

The mission of the IRBA, on the other hand, is to protect the financial interest of the South African public and international investors in South Africa, through the effective regulation of audits conducted by registered auditors and accountants, and in accordance with internationally recognised standards and processes. This is achieved by providing the means and the regulatory framework for the education and training of adequate numbers of competent and disciplined accountants and auditors, to serve the needs of South Africa. The Board strives constantly towards the maintenance and improvement of standards of registered auditors. It protects the public who rely on the services of registered auditors and supports registered auditors who carry out their duties competently, fearlessly and in good faith.

In order to ensure that all members, associates and trainees comply with the high professional standards set, SAICA provides technical support, continuing professional development (lifelong learning), disseminates and communicates the latest information on technical developments and business trends to its constituencies.

One of SAICA's major objectives is to ensure that membership of the accountancy profession better reflects the population demographics of South Africa. To this end, the Institute has a number of initiatives in place designed to increase the number of CAs(SA) from previously disadvantaged communities.

The responsibility for training prospective CAs(SA) is a shared one. SAICA is responsible for the registration of trainees and management of their training contracts, either in public practice or outside public practice. Trainees who do not wish to follow the public practice route may specialise in financial management. The Institute sets and adjudicates the Part I (QE 1) and the Part II in financial management examination (QE 2), for those trainees who have opted to take the financial management route. The IRBA exercises a monitoring role over the SAICA public practice training and QE I examination processes.

The IRBA is also responsible for setting and marking the Public Practice Examination (PPE) for those trainees choosing the public practice route. Trainees may only write QE 2 or PPE after they have passed QE 1 and upon the completion of a minimum of 18 months of a three-year training contract. After completing their training contract and passing both QE 1 and QE 2 or PPE, candidates are required to register with SAICA in order to use the Chartered Accountant [CA(SA)] designation.

The IRBA conducts practice reviews, investigations and disciplinary processes for registered auditors and accountants. Generally, an individual registered with the IRBA is also a CA(SA) registered with SAICA and therefore must comply with the Codes of Professional Conduct of both bodies. According to the Constitution and By-laws of SAICA, any alleged misconduct by a person who is a member of both bodies is dealt with by the IRBA, in the first instance. SAICA accepts the findings of the IRBA disciplinary process and imposes its own disciplinary sentences on those found guilty. Disciplinary matters relating to members not registered with the IRBA, and associates, are dealt with by the SAICA ethics and disciplinary process.

South African Designations

CA (SA) – The Chartered Accountant
See also Chartered Accountant: South Africa

Members of SAICA are entitled to use CA(SA) designation after their names. The designation is associated with someone who has considerable expertise in the theory and practice of accountancy. The requirements for qualification as a Chartered Accountant are:

 Education:
 Obtain a Bachelor of Commerce or an equivalent undergraduate qualification (Bachelor of Accountancy) recognized for this purpose.
 Obtain an additional postgraduate Honours degree or postgraduate diploma in Accounting.
 Obtain a "Certificate in the Theory of Accounting" (CTA) in conjunction with the postgraduate qualification (only awarded if all courses are passed in one sitting).
 Completion of a three-year training contract ("internship") selecting either of two routes:
 Training Inside Public Practice ("TIPP"): "Articles" with a Registered Training Organisation (RTO), a firm of Chartered Accountants in public practice (such as Deloitte, PKF, PriceWaterhouseCoopers, KPMG, or Ernst & Young);
 Training Outside Public Practice ("TOPP"): "Articles" with an Approved Training Organisation (ATO) in commerce and industry, typically at a large bank or corporate (excludes practice as an auditor).
 Pass, in sequence, the two "board examinations" set by the IRBA. The Qualifying Examination (QE) has two parts, and the second may only be written after passing Part 1 and after the candidate has undergone at least 20 months' training:
the first in accountancy, auditing, tax and financial management;
the second is the Assessment of Professional Competence which replaced the Part II Financial Management and Public Practice Exam.

AGA (SA) – The Associate General Accountant

An AGA (SA) is a highly skilled accountant who has completed both a SAICA-accredited BCom degree and SAICA accredited training programme.
AGAs operate in a broad range of varied work activities, most of which are complex and non-routine.

Core areas include:
 Financial accounting and reporting
 Managerial accounting and financial management
 Taxation
 Auditing, with specific reference to systems, internal auditing functions, internal control and corporate governance
 Information technology
 Payroll accounting.

AAT (SA) – The Associate Accounting Technician
The AAT qualification is offered through the Association of Accounting Technicians. The range of an AAT's work will vary widely. Generally AATs work in support positions and some of their key functions include:
 Purchase accounting
 Inventory control
 Payroll accounting
 Costing and budgeting
 Sales accounting and credit control
 Cash and banking
 Ledger accounts and the preparation of accounts
AAT trainees are required to complete a training contract of at least two years and must pass an examination before they are entitled to use the AAT (SA) designation. See .

CPA

A South African Chartered Accountant, or CA(SA), is the equivalent of a United States CPA (Certified Public Accountant).  However, the CPA designation also exists in South Africa. This qualification was previously designated CFA (Certified Financial Accountant). South African CPAs perform only accounting and tax work, usually for smaller entities, and may not perform auditing work.

A recent legal battle between SAICA and the CPA governing body: SAICA requested that the CPA designation be changed back to CFA (Certified Financial Accountant) because the "CPA" designation might create confusion to Americans who might believe that CPAs can act as auditors.  Using the term CPA is also a contravention of the Audit Profession Act which states that only CAs may use the term "Public Accountant" or "Registered Auditor".

The eventual outcome of this dispute was that the CPA governing body changed its name to SAIPA, the South African Institute of Professional Accountants, and its members designation changed to Professional Accountant (SA) without a corresponding acronym.

The requirements to earn the designation are:
Academic: A degree with a major in financial accounting and with tax, management accounting, auditing and commercial law as subjects.
Practical training or experience: at least 3 years under a SAIPA recognised Learnership, or 6 years of relevant verifiable experience.
SAIPA Professional Evaluation: This is a three-hour examination offered twice yearly covering financial accounting, auditing, taxation, commercial law, management accounting and practice management.

References

External links
The South African Institute of Chartered Accountants official website
The Independent Regulatory Board for Auditors official website

Research institutes in South Africa
Accounting in South Africa
Professional associations based in South Africa
Organisations based in Johannesburg
Member bodies of the International Federation of Accountants